Racing, known in Japan as  (part of the Simple 1500 series), and in Europe as Pro Racer, is a racing game developed by Tamsoft and published by Culture Publishers in 1999, A1 Games in 2000, and Midas Interactive Entertainment in 2003, all for PlayStation.

Reception

The game received negative reviews. In Japan, Famitsu gave it a score of 17 out of 40.

References

External links
 

1999 video games
PlayStation (console) games
PlayStation (console)-only games
Racing video games
Tamsoft video games
Video games developed in Japan